Victor Aaron González (born November 16, 1995) is a Mexican professional baseball pitcher for the Los Angeles Dodgers of Major League Baseball (MLB). He made his MLB debut in 2020.

Career

Minor leagues
González signed with the Los Angeles Dodgers as an international free agent on July 2, 2012. He began his professional career with the Arizona League Dodgers in 2013, going 3–2 with a 3.79 ERA over 38 innings. 

He spent the 2014 season with the Ogden Raptors, going 4–5 with a 6.09 ERA over  innings. He split the 2015 season between the AZL Dodgers, Ogden, and the Great Lakes Loons, and went a combined 1–7 with a 5.43 ERA over  innings. 

He returned to Great Lakes in 2016, going 3–6 with a 4.66 ERA over  innings. He missed all of the 2017 season due to an injury. 

He split the 2018 season between Ogden and Great Lakes, going a combined 1–5 with a 7.49 ERA over  innings. He split the 2019 season between the Rancho Cucamonga Quakes, Tulsa Drillers, and Oklahoma City Dodgers, going a combined 5–2 with a 2.31 ERA over  innings in 38 games (13 starts).

Los Angeles Dodgers
The Dodgers added González to their 40-man roster on October 31, 2019. He was called up to the MLB roster for the first time on July 30, 2020. González made his major league debut on July 31 against the Arizona Diamondbacks. He appeared in 20.1 innings in 15 games (one start) for the Dodgers in 2020, winning three games and finishing with a 1.33 ERA and 23 strikeouts with only three walks. In the postseason, González pitched  innings across eight games and allowed two runs on five hits and four walks while striking out five. He was the winning pitcher in the deciding Game 6 of the 2020 World Series. 

On April 17, 2021, González picked up his first big league save against the San Diego Padres. He pitched  innings for the Dodgers over 44 games during the 2021 season with a 3–1 record and 3.57 ERA. He struck out 33 but also had a high number of walks with 19.

González began the 2022 season the injured list with left elbow inflammation. On May 8 it was announced that he was going to undergo arthroscopic surgery and would miss a couple more months.

References

External links

1995 births
Living people
Arizona Complex League Dodgers players
Arizona League Dodgers players
Baseball players from Veracruz
Charros de Jalisco players
Great Lakes Loons players
Los Angeles Dodgers players
Major League Baseball pitchers
Major League Baseball players from Mexico
Mexican expatriate baseball players in the United States
Ogden Raptors players
Oklahoma City Dodgers players
Rancho Cucamonga Quakes players
Tulsa Drillers players
People from Tuxpan, Nayarit